Anictops is an extinct genus of Anagalida that lived during Early to Late Paleocene. The type species is A.tabiepedis which fossils are well-preserved at Palaeozoological Museum of China.

References

Anictops at Fossilworks
Anictops at Palaeozoological Museum of China official website (Chinese)

Prehistoric placental genera
Paleocene mammals
Fossils of China
Fossil taxa described in 1977